Emiliano Reyes (born March 31, 1984) is an American business executive and  humanitarian activist.

Early life and education
Reyes was born in Washington, D.C., the son of Kathleen McBride, a Swedish-American journalist, and Alexander Reyes, a bureaucrat and former activist of Mexican and Yaqui Indian origin. He grew up primarily in Berkeley, California and attended Berkeley High School with actor Eli Marienthal and poets Chinaka Hodge and Rafael Casal. He attended Fordham University where he graduated summa cum laude. In 2006, he was inducted into the exclusive Beta Gamma Sigma Honor Society, the highest honors for business students that is equivalent to Phi Beta Kappa honors.  From 2008 to 2010 he attended the Diplomatic Academy of Vienna where he graduated cum laude. He is believed to be the first Mexican-American to be accepted into the exclusive school.

Career
Beginning in 2005, Reyes began working and volunteering in international foundations, organizations, and institutions. In 2005, he worked with the Humanitarian Group the Free Burma Rangers along the border of Burma and Thailand.  In 2006, he interned at the Clinton Foundation where he primarily handled President Bill Clinton's scheduling requests. Later in the year, he was awarded the Pamela Harriman Fellowship and worked in the Economic Section of the American Embassy of London under Ambassador Robert Tuttle.  In 2006, he appeared on Hardball with Chris Matthews.

After graduation, he worked briefly at Young and Rubicam in the company's Latin American subsidiary The Bravo Group. In 2007, he was awarded The Congressman Jose Serrano Scholarship for Diplomatic Studies under the veil of the Fulbright Fellowship to attend the Diplomatic Academy of Vienna.  While there, he interned at the United Nations assisting the then Under-Secretary-General Antonio Maria Costa. He is an expert on the Asian Private Sector and has published articles for international encyclopedias on the subject.

Activism
Reyes has been involved in a number of different humanitarian initiatives over the past decade through a number of different projects.

2010 Haitian earthquake

In April 2010, he served as a director of the Diplomatic Academy Haiti Initiative which raised money for the children in Haiti after the 2010 Haitian earthquake.

Filmmaking

From 2006 to the present, Reyes has been actively writing screenplays across a number of genres. In 2012, he was a finalist at the Beverly Hills Film Festival and the Phoenix Film Festival.

The Tomorrow Project

In 2012, Reyes founded the Tomorrow Project: the independent campaign for President Barack Obama. The project was a way to energize the national  voters that were primarily members of the millennial generation who were unemployed, amassed in student debt and felt lost due to the constraints of the 2008 financial crisis. The project centered on a film entitled "Tomorrow" which was a fictional account of a 21-year-old Barack Obama on the night he discovers he will become president, via a drug cocktail. It also depicts his visions of events that will occur in the future, such as the September 11th Terrorist Attacks and the Iraq War. The film was to provide millennial voters with a personal connect with Barack Obama citing that he went through a similar crisis of fate that they are experiencing now.

Mexican Drug War

Reyes is currently developing a charter school in Mexico. The school, presently called the Zapata School, is named after Emiliano Zapata, a Mexican revolutionary and after whom Reyes was named by his parents. The philosophy behind the school is to provide a distraction to the conflict and give those affected hope that they can improve their lives by learning new skills. Classes offered include, art, drama, business and English.

Personal life
Emiliano is received his Masters in Business Administration at Emory University's Goizueta Business School in May 2014. He was in a relationship with Czech model and journalist Katerina Kombercova.

References

1984 births
Living people
American people of Swedish descent
American people of Mexican descent
American people of Yaqui descent
American humanitarians
American business executives
People from Washington, D.C.
Fordham University alumni